Craig Forman (born 1961, in New York City) is a partner at NextNews Ventures in San Francisco and past President and Chief Executive Officer of McClatchy, operator of 30 media companies in 29 U.S. markets in 14 states. Forman is a non-resident fellow at the Shorenstein Center at Harvard University's Kennedy School of Government, a media, technology and telecommunications entrepreneur and former foreign correspondent and bureau chief for The Wall Street Journal.

Career

WHERE Inc. and eBay

Forman has served on a variety of public and private company boards. He was executive chairman at mobile app advertising network Appia Inc., and an investor and board member at several other startups in telecom, technology and media. Along with colleagues Gordon Crovitz and Jim Friedlich, Forman co-founded and is a general partner at NextNews Ventures, an early-stage private investment fund, which invests in media, technology and telecom startups. 

Forman was executive chairman and a member of the Board of Directors of Where.com Inc., a leading location-based mobile commerce company that was acquired by EBay Inc. in April 2011. Forman joined the WHERE board in 2009. 

Since 2012, he has been on the board of directors and served as the governance and nominating committee chair of Montreal-based local advertising company Yellow Pages Limited (TSX:$Y).

Yahoo! and EarthLink

Prior, as EarthLink Inc's executive vice president and president of its Access and Audience division and chief product officer, Forman drove more than $1.2 billion in annual revenue with responsibility for the internet service provider's Access, PeoplePC, Voice, and Value-added Services businesses. He also led such shared services as Operations, Information Technology and Customer Support. EarthLink is America's sixth-largest ISP, measured by subscribers.

Forman joined EarthLink in March 2006 from Yahoo! Inc., where he headed its Media and Information division from 2004. Forman's responsibilities included most of the internet portal's leading properties including Yahoo! News, Yahoo Finance, Yahoo Sports, as well as its Health, Weather, Education, Kids, and other news and information businesses. Forman led a technology-driven content strategy that kept these properties as No. 1 in their categories despite external challenges from such competitors as Google, Microsoft and major media companies.

PBS and CNN roles

As a business executive and entrepreneur, Forman's career has been at the intersection of media, technology, and telecommunications. Forman served for four years as CEO and co-founder of Success Television LLP and MyPrimeTime Inc., a television production and venture-backed Internet company. Forman and his team produced two business and lifestyle PBS television series, "Great Entrepreneurs" and "Great Leaders," as well as broadband programming and an award-winning Internet site targeted at 35- to 54-year-old baby boomers. Forman is non-executive chairman of Success Television. "Great Entrepreneurs" was produced in association with WPBT, a PBS affiliate in south Florida.

Earlier, Forman served as a senior operating executive at Time Warner's CNN Group and Time Inc. divisions, and at The Wall Street Journal/Dow Jones. He also was a member of the management team that took early search-engine Infoseek public. As VP at CNN Financial News, Forman led the team that made CNNfn.com one of the leading financial websites, and one of the first news sites to turn profitable. As VP-Worldwide Development at Time Inc. New Media, Forman managed the Internet businesses of Fortune and Money magazines while also serving as CEO of Thrive, a healthy-living joint venture with AOL. He also played an influential role in helping Time Warner develop a viable independent internet strategy before its troubled combination with AOL in 2000. Previously, as Infoseek's first editor and VP of Product Management, Forman helped build one of the pioneering search engines.

Forman is also the author of Be Luckier in Life, an Amazon top-selling book, a career guide for business success. He is a contributor to Atlantic Media's Quartz online news and economic site.

The Wall Street Journal and Pulitzer nomination

For 13 years prior to his joining Infoseek, Forman served as a general manager, editor, bureau chief, and foreign correspondent at Dow Jones and The Wall Street Journal. As director of DJ's Business Information Services International unit, Forman helped develop the Online Journal globally, and expanded the electronic-publishing division to over 50 countries. As Tokyo Bureau Chief of the Journal, Forman diversified the output of the bureau into broadcast as well as print. While based in London as the Journal's Deputy Bureau Chief, Forman was a member of the 1991 Persian Gulf War reporting team that was finalist for a Pulitzer Prize.

Issue One – Council for Responsible Social Media

In October 2022, Forman joined the Council for Responsible Social Media project launched by Issue One to address the negative mental, civic, and public health impacts of social media in the United States co-chaired by former House Democratic Caucus Leader Dick Gephardt and former Massachusetts Lieutenant Governor Kerry Healey.

References

External links 
Innovation and New Media Speaker

American male journalists
Living people
The Wall Street Journal people
Princeton School of Public and International Affairs alumni
Yale Law School alumni
1961 births